AEK may refer to:

AEK, a sports club from Athens, Greece, the best known club by this name. Most clubs with the name "AEK" copied the Athens club's name.
AEK F.C., the association football team
AEK B.C., the association basketball team 
AEK V.C., the men's volleyball team
AEK Women's V.C., the women's volleyball team
AEK H.C., the handball team
AEK Futsal, the futsal team
AEK-971, a Russian assault rifle
AEK-999, a Russian machine gun
AEK Larnaca, an association football club in Larnaca, Cyprus
Apple Extended Keyboard, a computer keyboard
Haeke language
Aseki Airport, an airport in Papua New Guinea (see: List of airports by IATA code: A)
 Alfabetatze Euskalduntze Koordinakundea